At the "Golden Circle" Stockholm is an avant-garde jazz live album in two volumes by the Ornette Coleman Trio, documenting concerts on the nights of December 3 and 4, 1965, at the Gyllene Cirkeln jazz club in Stockholm. Both volumes were released in early 1966. This marked the beginning of Coleman's contract with Blue Note after he left Atlantic Records. It also debuted Coleman’s usage of the trumpet and violin, instruments in which he took three years teaching himself to play after leaving Atlantic.

Reception

The music has been described as "brilliant, optimistic closely unified thematic improvisations". "Snowflakes and Sunshine" marked the introduction of his unconventional violin and trumpet playing. "In Coleman's hands, both instruments are refunctioned into 'sound tools' (...) producers of sounds, rhythms and emotions." The Penguin Guide to Jazz listed both volumes as part of its "Core Collection" and gave each a four-star rating (of a possible four stars).  Pitchfork ranked the album as the 156th best of the 1960s.

The 2002 CD reissue includes previously unreleased bonus tracks in both volumes.

Track listing
All tracks written by Ornette Coleman.

Volume 1
 "Faces and Places"
 "European Echoes"
 "Dee Dee"
 "Dawn"
 "Faces and Places" (Alternate take) (*)
 "European Echoes" (Alternate take) (*)
 "Doughnuts" (*)

(*) Previously unreleased bonus tracks included in the 2002 CD reissue.

Volume 2
 "Snowflakes and Sunshine"
 "Morning Song"
 "The Riddle"
 "Antiques"
 "Morning Song" (Alternate take) (*)
 "The Riddle" (Alternate take) (*)
 "Antiques" (Alternate take) (*)

(*) Previously unreleased bonus tracks included in the 2002 CD reissue.

Personnel
 Ornette Coleman — alto saxophone, trumpet, violin
 David Izenzon — double bass
 Charles Moffett — drums

References

Ornette Coleman live albums
1966 live albums
Blue Note Records live albums
Live free jazz albums
Live avant-garde jazz albums